The 1983 Wellington City mayoral election was part of the New Zealand local elections held that same year. In 1983, elections were held for the Mayor of Wellington plus other local government positions including eighteen city councillors. The polling was conducted using the standard first-past-the-post electoral method.

Background
The election saw deputy mayor Ian Lawrence voted in as the new Mayor of Wellington to replace Sir Michael Fowler who had retired. Lawrence retained the Mayoralty for the Citizens' Association, seeing off a challenge from high profile Labour Party councillor Helene Ritchie. Given Lawrence's quiet style and low profile compared to Ritchie's more marked public reputation, most commentators and pollsters were predicting a very close result. The eventual outcome was a surprise to many with Lawrence winning by a margin exceeding 8,000 votes, with media dubbing him "Landslide Lawrence". Ritchie retrospectively blamed her loss on an "anti-woman vote".

The 1983 election was also notable as it saw former Citizens' councillor Leone Harkness re-elected to the council as an independent candidate, the first time a candidate without an official party ticket had been elected to the council since Berkeley Dallard in 1950. It also saw Jenny Brough (later Harris) retain her seat on the council after defecting from Labour in 1982. It also marked the last time in Wellington where local body elections elected councillors at large.

Mayoralty results

Councillor results

 
 
 
 
 
 
 
 
 
 
 
 
 
 
 
 
 
 
 
 
 
 
 
 
 
 
 
 
 
 
 
 
 
 
 
 
 
 
 

 

Table footnotes:
<noinclude>

References

Mayoral elections in Wellington
1983 elections in New Zealand
Politics of the Wellington Region
1980s in Wellington
October 1983 events in New Zealand